The discography of American rapper Fat Joe consists of ten studio albums, two collaborative albums, three mixtapes and twenty-two singles, as well as other artists' singles in which Fat Joe did a guest performance. Fat Joe is an American rapper known for his solo work and membership in the rap groups D.I.T.C. (Diggin' in the Crates) and Terror Squad. His first solo album was Represent, released in 1993, followed by Jealous One's Envy in 1995. From 1998 to 2006, he was signed to Atlantic Records, releasing four albums under the label, Don Cartagena in 1998, Jealous Ones Still Envy (J.O.S.E.) in 2001, Loyalty in 2002, and All or Nothing in 2005. Starting in 2006, when his album Me, Myself, & I was released, Fat Joe was signed to Imperial Records, which distributes through Terror Squad Entertainment. His follow-up album was The Elephant in the Room, which was released in 2008; Jealous Ones Still Envy 2 (J.O.S.E. 2), the sequel to his successful album Jealous Ones Still Envy (J.O.S.E.), was released in 2009.

On July 27, 2010, Fat Joe released his tenth album titled The Darkside Vol. 1.

The debut album of D.I.T.C. was released in 2000. Fat Joe participated in both Terror Squad albums: Terror Squad (1999) and True Story (2004). Terror Squad had a number-one hit, "Lean Back", in 2004. He has an album with Dre called Family Ties which was released on December 6, 2019.

Albums

Studio albums

Collaborative albums

Mixtapes

Singles

As lead artist

As featured artist

Promotional singles

Other charted songs

Guest appearances

Notes

References

Hip hop discographies
 
Discographies of American artists
Reggaeton discographies